McConchie is a surname. Notable people with the surname include:

Cole McConchie (born 1992), New Zealand cricketer
Dan McConchie, American politician
Jack McConchie (1910–1998), Australian rules footballer
Lorna McConchie (1914–2001), Australian netball player, coach and sports administrator
Lyn McConchie, New Zealand writer

See also
McConchie Ridge, a ridge in Antarctica